The list of shipwrecks in 1982 includes ships sunk, foundered, grounded, or otherwise lost during 1982.

January

1 January

5 January

12 January

20 January

26 January

29 January

February

8 February

9 February

12 February

15 February

16 February

18 February

20 February

23 February

26 February

28 February

March

4 March

7 March

11 March

30 March

31 March

April

9 April

13 April

18 April

26 April

May

2 May

4 May

10 May

11 May

13 May

16 May

21 May

22 May

24 May

25 May

30 May

June

4 June

6 June

8 June

9 June

11 June

16 June

19 June

21 June

27 June

28 June

July

3 July

14 July

18 July

23 July

31 July

August

2 August

9 August

16 August

30 August

September

7 September

10 September

11 September

16 September

18 September

30 September

October

12 October

16 October

21 October

24 October

25 October

November

12 November

14 November

21 November

December

7 December

12 December

19 December

27 December

31 December

Unknown date

Unknown date

See also 
 Lists of shipwrecks

References

1982
 
Shipwrecks